Senegal competed at the 2000 Summer Olympics in Sydney, Australia.

Athletics 

Men
Track and road events

Women
Track and road events

Field events

Basketball

Women's tournament 

Team roster
 Mame Maty Mbengue
 Bineta Diouf
 Yacine Khady Ngom
 Coumba Cissé
 Marieme Lo
 Awa Guèye
 Ndialou Paye
 Mbarika Fall
 Khady Diop
 Adama Diakhaté
 Fatime N'Diaye
 Astou N'Diaye

Group play

11th place match

Boxing

Judo

Women

Swimming

Men

Women

Wrestling

Freestyle

References

Nations at the 2000 Summer Olympics
2000
Summer Olympics